Lower Cheung Sha Beach is a gazetted beach located in Cheung Sha in southern Lantau Island, Hong Kong. The beach is managed by the Leisure and Cultural Services Department of the Hong Kong Government. The beach is 96 metres long and is rated as good to fair by the Environmental Protection Department for its water quality in the past twenty years. Near the beach is the Upper Cheung Sha Beach, but the Upper Cheung Sha Beach is not connected to the Lower Cheung Sha Beach.

Usage
The beach is set within a large embayment on Lantau Island’s southern coastline formed by the Chi Ma Wan Peninsula and Luk Keng Shan. The beach, along with Tong Fuk and Upper Cheung Sha beaches, offers beautiful views of Cha Kwo Chau.

Features
The beach has the following features:
 Changing rooms
 Showers
 Toilets

See also
 Beaches of Hong Kong

References

External links 

 Official website

Lantau Island
Beaches of Hong Kong